Walter Cecil "Tex" Rudloff (August 8, 1926 – October 10, 2015) was an American sound engineer. He was nominated for an Academy Award in the category Best Sound for the film The Buddy Holly Story. His son, Gregg Rudloff, also worked in sound.

Selected filmography
 The Buddy Holly Story (1978)

References

External links

1926 births
2015 deaths
American audio engineers